AS Viganello, also known as Viganello Basket was a Swiss men's and women's professional basketball club based in the city of Viganello. The club was played for several years in the National League A and won the Swiss men's championship in 1980 and the Swiss Men's Cup in 1977 and 1980.

History
AS Viganello began as a women's team in 1942, in the village of Ticino (now district of the city of Lugano) and in 1943 it also added a men's team.
 
Thanks to the arrival of important players such as Ken Brady, John Fultz and Charlie Yelverton, the men's team began to achieve success. In 1977 Viganello played in the Swiss Cup finals against Pregassona in front of a sold out crowd. After a tightly played game, Viganello came out on top after overtime, winning 107-103. It added another cup victory in 1980 as well as the Swiss national championship.

The club folded after the 1980–1981 season due to financial difficulties and as a result, merged with Federal Lugano into the FV Lugano.

European club competitions
The club competed in the following European competitions.

Honours

Men's team
Swiss League:
 Winners (1): 1979–80
Swiss Cup
 Winners (2): 1976–77, 1979–80

Notable players

 Charlie Yelverton (1979–1980)

References

Basketball teams established in 1942
Basketball teams in Switzerland